SBM Label is a Polish hip-hop label based in Warsaw, Poland, until 2018 operating under the name SB Maffija Label. The label's contracted artists include rappers Solar, Białas, Beteo, White 2115, Jan-Rapowanie, Mata, Adi Nowak, Kinny Zimmer, Fukaj, Janusz Walczuk, Nypel and Lanek, the band Kacperczyk, and music producers Lanek and DJ Johny. Former SBM Label members included: ADM, Neile, the duo Avi & Louis Villain, Got Barss, Wiatr, Nowak vel Nowaczyński, Deemz, Nocny, Zui, Moli and Bedoes (he is now involved with his own label 2115 Gang).

The founders of the label are rappers Solar and Białas. The first album released on the label is Z ostatniej ławki by Solar and Białas.

History 
In 2008, the duo Solar/Bialas started their activity, around which soon formed the hip-hop crew SB Maffija, which included: Solar, Białas, King TomB, Quebonafide, ADM, Beteo, Neile, Danny, Hary, Blejk, Żabson, Bonson, Koldi, Lanek, Dj Johny, Got Barss, Deys, Foux, Wiciu, Pejot, Trzy-Sześć and MMX. After ending their collaboration with Prosto Label and Step Records, the rappers launched their own label in 2016 under the name SB Maffija Label, simultaneously announcing the addition of their first two artists, Beteo and Bedoes and after some time ADM and Neile were also contracted. In 2018, the label changed its name from SB Maffija Label to SBM Label.

In June 2020, an initiative was born where artists affiliated with the label stayed together in a Kashubian hotel to create the first collaborative album entirely of the collective, Hotel Maffija, which was released on June 6.

Albums

References 

Polish music
Polish record labels